The December 31 Korakuen Hall Show is a professional wrestling event produced annually on December 31 at Korakuen Hall by various independent professional wrestling promotions such as Big Japan Pro Wrestling (BJW), DDT Pro-Wrestling (DDT) and Kaientai Dojo (K-Dojo). 

The tradition of holding a joint event for smaller promotions on New Year's Eve at Korakuen Hall started with the 2006 Indy Summit. Until then, the venue was used for Nippon TV's Kasou Taishou broadcast. In 2007 and 2008, special editions of the Pro-Wrestling Summit were held. In 2009, a special event as part of the third Tenka Sanbun no Kei tour was held and birthed the  brand that would persist for all future events.

Events

References

External links
The official DDT Pro-Wrestling website
December 31 Shows at ProWrestlingHistory.com

Recurring events established in 2006
2006 establishments in Japan
Active Advance Pro Wrestling
Big Japan Pro Wrestling shows
DDT Pro-Wrestling shows
Professional wrestling in Tokyo
Professional wrestling joint events